Walter E. Harris  (9 June 1915 – 21 October 2011) was a Canadian analytical chemist and academic.

Born near Wetaskiwin, Alberta, he received Bachelor of Science (1938) and Master of Science (1939) degrees from the University of Alberta and a PhD in Analytical Chemistry from the University of Minnesota during World War II. Harris returned to the University of Alberta in 1946 to teach, and was a professor until 1980, at which time he was granted the title professor emeritus. He served as the Chair of the Department of Chemistry from 1974 to 1980. In 1998, he was honoured by being made a Member of the Order of Canada.

References

1915 births
2011 deaths
Canadian chemists
Fellows of the Royal Society of Canada
Members of the Order of Canada
Academic staff of the University of Alberta
University of Alberta alumni
University of Minnesota alumni